Glamoured is a studio album by American jazz singer Cassandra Wilson. The record was released on the Blue Note label in 2003.

Reception 
Thom Jurek of AllMusic wrote: "On Glamoured, Wilson composed half the album, and her songs are as provocative and deserve the same weight of grace critically afforded her covers. She uses her trademark fluid, smoky delivery to redefine songs such as the old soul nugget 'If Loving You Is Wrong'; the poignancy it was written with tells of a woman lost in the delirium of a forbidden love with a married man. The ache and euphoria in her voice shot through with producer Fabrizio Sotti's stunning acoustic guitar interplay is nearly overwhelming in its emotion." Nick Dedina of Napster commented: "The name of this album refers to those under a spell, which is exactly the effect of this hypnotizing mix of jazz, blues and folk. Recording again in her native Mississippi, Wilson works her magic over interwoven guitars and tribal drums on vivid originals and covers, including a ribald take on Bob Dylan's 'Lay Lady Lay'." The Buffalo News review by Jeff Simon noted, "Cassandra Wilson is clearly one of the finest jazz singers to emerge from her generation. But it is with live performance that she has made her mark in the jazz world; there, she becomes an improviser non pareil, at once echoing the giants who came before her and suggesting an individual ethic oddly and idiosyncratically beautiful."

A reviewer of NPR added: "On her latest album, Glamoured, Wilson applies her rich, husky voice to a variety of musical genres." A reviewer of Dusty Groove noted: "Don't let the title put you off, because Cassandra Wilson's sounding as soulful as ever – with none of the fluff that you might think from an album called "Glamoured"! The sound is mellow and laidback, with a group that includes Wilson on guitar, alongside a few other guitarists, percussion, and even a bit of harmonica. The instrumentation gives the album a warm and earthy feel that works well with Wilson's vocals."

Track listing 
All tracks composed by Cassandra Wilson; except where indicated
 "Fragile" (Sting) — 4:37
 "Sleight of Time" — 4:12
 "I Want More" (Fabrizio Sotti, Wilson) — 4:21
 "If Loving You Is Wrong" (Homer Banks, Carl Hampton, Raymond Jackson) — 5:29
 "Lay Lady Lay" (Bob Dylan) — 5:08
 "Crazy" (Willie Nelson) — 3:02
 "What Is It?" — 3:19
 "Heaven Knows" — 5:06
 "Honey Bee" (Muddy Waters) — 4:48
 "Broken Drum" — 4:14
 "On This Train" (Fabrizio Sotti, Wilson) — 4:37
 "Throw It Away" (Abbey Lincoln) — 4:36

Personnel 
Cassandra Wilson – vocals, acoustic guitar
Terri Lyne Carrington – drums
Jeff Haynes – percussion
Calvin X Jones – bass
Gregoire Maret – harmonica
Herlin Riley – drums, washboard
Brandon Ross – banjo, guitar
Fabrizio Sotti – guitar
Reginald Veal – bass
Production notes
Cassandra Wilson – producer
Fabrizio Sotti – producer
Bruce Lundvall – executive producer
Sean Macke – engineer
Eric Butler – engineer, mixing
Chris Athens – mastering
Peter Doris – assistant engineer
Kent Bruce – assistant engineer
Gordon Jee – creative director, creative design
Judy Jefferson – production coordination
Donald Thomas – production coordination
Naomi Kaltman – photography

Chart positions

References 

2003 albums
Blue Note Records albums
Cassandra Wilson albums